James Woodward Downey (born ) is an American comedy writer and occasional actor. Downey wrote for over 30 seasons of Saturday Night Live, making him the longest tenured writer in the show's history. SNL creator Lorne Michaels called Downey the "best political humorist alive".

Early life and education
Downey grew up in Joliet, Illinois. After graduating from Joliet Catholic High School, he entered Harvard University, where he wrote for the Harvard Lampoon and later became its president. He graduated from Harvard in 1974 with a degree in Russian.

Writing
In 1976, Downey joined the Saturday Night Live writing staff as its youngest member. He was among the first Harvard Lampoon writers to write for television; writer Steve O'Donnell said "the proliferation of cable and the proliferation of comedy [led] the sensibilities of the Lampoon [to become] a little closer to the sensibilities of the mass media." Simpsons writer Mike Reiss called Downey "patient zero" of Lampoon comedy writers.

Downey ultimately worked on 27 of the show's first 32 seasons, one of the longest tenures in the show's history.  He arrived at Saturday Night Live the same week as Bill Murray with whom he ended up sharing an office overlooking 50th Street, but he mostly began writing at SNL with Al Franken, Tom Davis, and Dan Aykroyd.  His first stretch as writer for the show ran from 1976 to 1980, culminating in a brief stint as a featured cast member. By the 1979–1980 season, Lorne Michaels had lost both Dan Aykroyd and John Belushi to feature film careers, causing him to look to writers like Downey, Tom Schiller, Dan Aykroyd's brother Peter, Al Franken, Alan Zweibel, and Tom Davis to fill spots as cast members (along with SNL bandleader Paul Shaffer and newcomer Harry Shearer). Downey left the show in 1980 as part of the mass exodus of writers and actors following Lorne Michaels' departure.

After leaving SNL, Downey became head writer of Late Night with David Letterman for a little over a year, 1982 to 1983, during its formative stages. He returned to SNL in 1984, serving for a while as head writer.  When Norm Macdonald began as Weekend Update anchor in the mid-1990s, Downey wrote exclusively for that segment of the show. Downey and Macdonald subsequently became a team, working away from the rest of the cast and crew. They were both fired from the show in 1998 at the request of NBC executive Don Ohlmeyer. Downey believes that it was a result of various jokes on Weekend Update calling O. J. Simpson a murderer; Ohlmeyer was a good friend of Simpson's.

Downey returned to the show in 2000. He continued to write for the show until 2013, pausing only in 2005 to work on a novel. For an October 2000 skit satirizing a recent presidential debate, Downey coined the word "strategery" for then-presidential candidate George W. Bush to say, based on Bush's reputation for difficulty with public speaking. The word soon began to be used in a tongue-in-cheek fashion by members of Bush's own administration, as well as by political pundits on both sides, to refer to the Bush administration's political strategy.

Former SNL Weekend Update anchor Dennis Miller has called him the second most important person in the history of Saturday Night Live, behind only creator Lorne Michaels.  In 2013, he retired from Saturday Night Live after the end of the 38th season after working part-time, commuting from Upstate New York.

Acting
Although he was only a credited actor on Saturday Night Live for one season, Downey appeared in over 40 sketches from 1977 to 2005, his most notable being parody commercials such as Craig's Travellers Checks, First CityWide Change Bank, and Grayson Moorhead Securities. In 2007, he appeared in a Digital Short titled Andy's Dad, where he portrayed the father of cast member Andy Samberg, and had a romantic relationship with guest star Jonah Hill.

In movies, he is probably best remembered for playing the high school principal who judges the "academic decathlon" in Billy Madison. His brief role in that film included a famous monologue in which he insults the title character, played by Adam Sandler, concluding with the sentence "I award you no points, and may God have mercy on your soul." The monologue was based on a response Downey often gave to SNL cast member (and fellow Billy Madison cast member) Chris Farley in the SNL writers' room when Farley presented certain ideas.

He appeared in the Norm Macdonald movie Dirty Work as one of the homeless guys. Downey also had a bit part in Paul Thomas Anderson's 2007 film There Will Be Blood, where he plays Al Rose, Little Boston's real estate broker. Anderson's YouTube channel is Al Rose Promotions, a nod to Downey's role.

Political views
Given Downey's role in writing much of the political humor featured on Saturday Night Live during his tenure there, his own political leanings have been a source of speculation. Downey has said that he began his career as "a standard-issue Harvard graduate commie", but later turned into "a conservative Democrat". He is a registered Democratic Party member. In 2008 he expressed his support for then-presidential-candidate Barack Obama. Nonetheless, his comedic targets have included American politicians across the political spectrum. TV critic Tom Shales, author of the book Live from New York: The Uncensored History of Saturday Night Live, called Downey, and SNL, an "equal opportunity slasher" in political comedy.

Some have called Downey more right-wing than his self-description, including Shales, who described him in 2002 as "a Republican" and "pretty conservative". In the Huffington Post, former SNL head writer Adam McKay called Downey "right-wing" and an "Ann Coulter pal". On a 2019 podcast, Al Franken described Downey as a "thoughtful conservative."

In early 2008, Downey wrote sketches for SNL mocking the then-ongoing Democratic presidential debates that depicted the news media as biased toward Obama. After the first sketch aired, candidate Hillary Clinton referred to it at the beginning of the next debate. The sketches were controversial; McKay suggested that they were a ploy to favor Republicans, since Clinton would be a weaker candidate than Obama. In response, Downey "said he probably favored Mr. Obama over Mrs. Clinton, but that he genuinely felt she was receiving tougher treatment from the news media". He denied that SNL had intended to help Clinton. According to the Project for Excellence in Journalism the SNL sketches may have prompted tougher news coverage of Obama.

On Obama, he stated, "If I had to describe Obama as a comedy project, I would say, 'Degree of difficulty, 10 point 10.' It’s like being a rock climber looking up at a thousand-foot-high face of solid obsidian, polished and oiled. There’s not a single thing to grab onto—certainly not a flaw or hook that you can caricature."

Filmography

Television

Film

References

External links
 
 

Living people
American male comedians
21st-century American comedians
American comedy writers
American male film actors
American male television actors
American television producers
Place of birth missing (living people)
American television writers
American male television writers
Primetime Emmy Award winners
The Harvard Lampoon alumni
21st-century American screenwriters
21st-century American male writers
Year of birth missing (living people)